The Stone Roses Live: Blackpool Empress Ballroom was a live performance by The Stone Roses, released on 4 November 1991 in the UK. It contained a series of tracks recorded at a concert in Blackpool, Lancashire, England on 12 August 1989. The release was directed by Geoff Wonfor, who also worked with Paul McCartney, Eurythmics and on the TV show The Tube.

Track listing
 "I Wanna Be Adored"
 "Elephant Stone"
 "Waterfall"
 "Sugar Spun Sister"
 "Made of Stone"
 "She Bangs the Drums"
 "Where Angels Play"
 "Shoot You Down"
 "Going Down"
 "Mersey Paradise"
 "I Am the Resurrection"

Personnel
Ian Brown – vocals, bongos
John Squire – guitar
Mani – bass guitar
Reni – drums, backing vocals
Cressa – dancing

References

External links
 
 The Stone Roses Live: Blackpool Empress Ballroom at YouTube
 The Stone Roses Live: Blackpool Empress Ballroom at Discogs

The Stone Roses